Sanjay Perwani is a Pakistani politician who has been a member of the Provincial Assembly of Sindh since August 2018. Previously he was a member of the National Assembly of Pakistan, from June 2013 to May 2018.

Political career

He was elected to the National Assembly of Pakistan as a candidate of Muttahida Qaumi Movement (MQM) on a seat reserved for minorities in the 2013 Pakistani general election.

He was elected to the Provincial Assembly of Sindh as a candidate of MQM on a seat reserved for minorities in the 2018 Pakistani general election.

References

Living people
Pakistani MNAs 2013–2018
Muttahida Qaumi Movement MNAs
Sindhi people
Pakistani Hindus
Muttahida Qaumi Movement MPAs (Sindh)
Year of birth missing (living people)